Sadr al-Din Musa(1305-1391)(صدر الدين) was the son and successor of Safi-ad-din Ardabili. His mother was Bibi Fatima, daughter of Zahed Gilani. Sadr al-Din directed the Safaviyya for 59 years. During this time, the activities of the Safaviyya were viewed with favour by Timur, who provided an endowment for the shrine of Safi-ad-din Ardabili in Ardabil, and allowed Sadr al-Din to collect taxes. Timur also offered Sadr al-Din to request any favour from himself, and Sheikh Sadr al-Din asked for the release of Turkish prisoners captured by Timur from Diyarbakır. Timur accepted this request, and the freed prisoners became Sadr al-Din's loyal disciples. The descendants of these freed prisoners, emigrating by the thousands into Gilan Province, would later aid his family to found a dynasty.

He was buried at Ardabil near his father. His son Khwādja Ali († 1429) succeeded him as leader of the Safaviyya.

See also
Safaviyya Order
Sufism
Safavid dynasty
Safavid dynasty family tree

Notes

Safavid dynasty
Safaviyeh order
Kurdish Sufis
14th-century Kurdish people
1305 births
1391 deaths